Mockery or mocking is the act of insulting or making light of a person or other thing, sometimes merely by taunting, but often by making a caricature, purporting to engage in imitation in a way that highlights unflattering characteristics. Mockery can be done in a lighthearted and gentle way, but can also be cruel and hateful, such that it "conjures images of corrosion, deliberate degradation, even subversion; thus, 'to laugh at in contempt, to make sport of' (OED)". Mockery appears to be unique to humans, and serves a number of psychological functions, such as reducing the perceived imbalance of power between authority figures and common people. Examples of mockery can be found in literature and the arts.

Etymology and function

The root word mock traces to the Old French mocquer (later moquer), meaning to scoff at, laugh at, deride, or fool, although the origin of mocquer is itself unknown. Labeling a person or thing as a mockery may also be used to imply that it or they are a poor quality or counterfeit version of some genuine other, such as the case in the usages: "mockery of man" or "the trial was a mockery of justice".

Mockery in psychology
Australian linguistics professor Michael Haugh differentiated between teasing and mockery by emphasizing that, while the two do have substantial overlap in meaning, mockery does not connote repeated provocation or the intentional withholding of desires, and instead implies a type of imitation or impersonation where a key element is that the nature of the act places a central importance on the expectation that it not be taken seriously. Specifically in examining non-serious forms of jocular mockery, Haugh summarized the literature on the features of mockery as consisting of the following:

 Laughter, especially on the part of the speaker, acting as a cue that others are invited to laugh also
 Phonetic practices, such as a "smile voice" and modulating “sing-song” pitch which mark actions "as laughable", denote an exaggerated level of animation, and indicate irony
 Facial cues, such as smiling, winking or other intentionally exaggerated expressions which mark actions as laughable, ironic, and non-serious
 Bodily cues, such as covering the face, or clapping
 Exaggeration, emphasizing extreme cases and making claims obviously above or below what is reasonable
 Incongruity through allusions and presuppositions to create implicit contrast
 Formulaicity and "topic shift markers" to indicate an end to non-seriousness and a return to serious interaction

In turn, the audience of the mockery may reply with a number of additional cues to indicate that the actions are understood as non-serious, including laughter, explicit agreement,  or a continuation or elaboration of the mockery.

Jayne Raisborough and Matt Adams alternatively identified mockery as a type of disparagement humour mainly available as a tool of privileged groups, which ensures normative responses from non-privileged groups. They emphasize that mockery may be used ironically and comedically, to identify moral stigma and signal moral superiority, but also as a form of social encouragement, allowing those who are providing social cues, to do so in a way that provides a level of social distance between the criticism and critic through use of parody and satire. In this way, mockery can function as a "more superficially 'respectable', morally sensitive way of doing class-based distinction than less civil disgust."

Mockery in philosophy
The philosopher Baruch Spinoza took a dim view of mockery, contending that it rests "upon a false opinion and proclaim[s] the imperfection of the mocker". He reasoned that either the object of the mockery is not ridiculous, in which case the mocker is wrong in treating it in such a way, or it is ridiculous, in which case mockery is not an effective tool for improvement. Though the mocker reveals that they recognize the imperfection, they do nothing to resolve it using good reason. Writing in his Tractatus Politicus, Spinoza declared that mockery was a form of hatred and sadness "which can never be converted into joy".

Catholic Bishop Francis de Sales, in his 1877 Introduction to the Devout Life, decried mockery as a sin:

Alternatively, while philosophers John Locke and Anthony Ashley-Cooper, 3rd Earl of Shaftesbury agreed on the importance of critical inquiry regarding the views of authority figures, Shaftesbury saw an important role specifically for mockery in this process. Shaftesbury held that "a moderate use of mockery could correct vices," and that mockery was among the most important challenges for truth, because "if an opinion cannot stand mockery" then it similarly would be "revealed to be ridiculous". As such all serious claims of knowledge should be subjected to it. This was a view echoed by René Descartes, who saw mockery as a "trait of a good man" which "bears witness to the cheerfulness of his temper ... tranquility of his soul ... [and] the ingenuity of his mind."

In philosophical argument, the appeal to ridicule (also called appeal to mockery, ab absurdo, or the horse laugh) is an informal fallacy which presents an opponent's argument as absurd, ridiculous, or humorous, and therefore not worthy of serious consideration. Appeal to ridicule is often found in the form of comparing a nuanced circumstance or argument to a laughably commonplace occurrence or to some other irrelevancy on the basis of comedic timing, wordplay, or making an opponent and their argument the object of a joke. This is a rhetorical tactic that mocks an opponent's argument or standpoint, attempting to inspire an emotional reaction (making it a type of appeal to emotion) in the audience and to highlight any counter-intuitive aspects of that argument, making it appear foolish and contrary to common sense. This is typically done by making a mockery of the argument's foundation that represents it in an uncharitable and oversimplified way.

Mockery in the arts

Mockery is one form of the literary genre of satire, and it has been noted that "[t]he mock genres and the practice of literary mockery goes back at least as far as the sixth century BCE". Mockery, as a genre, can also be directed towards other artistic genres:

The English comedy troupe, Monty Python, was considered to be particularly adept at the mockery of both authority figures and people making a pretense to competence beyond their abilities. One such sketch, involving a nearly-deaf hearing aid salesman and a nearly-blind contact lens salesman, depicts them as "both desperately unsuccessful, and exceedingly hilarious. The comicality of such characters is largely due to the fact that the objects of mockery themselves create a specific context in which we find that they deserve being ridiculed". In the United States, the television show, Saturday Night Live has been noted as having "a history of political mockery", and it has been proposed that "[h]istorical and rhetorical analyses argue that this mockery matters" with respect to political outcomes.

Development in humans
Mockery appears to be a uniquely human activity. Although several species of animal are observed to engage in laughter, humans are the only animal observed to use laughter to mock one another.

An examination of the appearance of the capacity for mockery during childhood development indicates that mockery "does not appear as an expectable moment in early childhood, but becomes more prominent as the latency child enters the social world of sibling rivalry, competition, and social interaction". As it develops, it is "displayed in forms of schoolyard bullying and certainly in adolescence with the attempt to achieve independence while negotiating the conflicts arising out of encounters with authority." One common element of mockery is caricature, a wide-ranging practice of imitating and exaggerating aspects of the subject being mocked. It has been suggested that caricature produced "survival advantages of rapid decoding of facial information", and at the same time that it provides "some of our best humor and, when suffused with too much aggression, may reach the form of mockery". Mockery serves a number of social functions:

Richard Borshay Lee reported mockery as a facet of Bushmen culture designed to keep individuals who are successful in certain regards from becoming arrogant. When weaker people are mocked by stronger people, this can constitute a form of bullying.

See also

Bullying
Irony
Roast (comedy)
Sarcasm
Taunting
Tongue-in-cheek
Ad hominem

References

External links
 
 
 

Abuse
Bullying
Human behavior